Oddbods (also known as The Oddbods Show) is a Singaporean computer-animated comedy television series produced by One Animation. The series centers on seven characters—Bubbles, Pogo, Newt, Jeff, Slick, Fuse and Zee—wearing furry suits of different colors. The characters make sounds but there is no dialogue, making the series easily translatable and international.

The series debuted in 2013, and the first season ended in 2015. Each season has 60 episodes. Season two followed in 2016. Season three released in April 4, 2022 on Netflix. Each episode is relatively short, and various formats have been broadcast, including one-, five-, and seven-minute episodes.

The series has won several awards since its debut, including the Asian Television Awards, Apollo Awards, Gold Panda Awards, and Web TV Asia Awards. In 2017, it was nominated for an international Kids Emmy Award.

Plot
The series focuses on seven creatures in colorful furry suits called the Oddbods: Fuse, Pogo, Newt, Slick, Bubbles, Jeff and Zee.

The storyline of each episode depicts how these characters "survive the perils of everyday life, unintentionally turning ordinary situations into unexpected, extraordinary and always humorous events." Episodes typically employ physical comedy and pranks played out between the characters, and the events that follow.

The series was conceived as a non-dialogue comedy, which the series' creators and writers say, "captures the madcap yet charming antics of the Oddbods, who celebrate success where they find it and take failure in their stride. To turn 'different' into a positive; celebrating individuality in a humorous, warm and unexpected way."

The series' strapline is "Embrace Your Inner Odd, There's a Little Odd in Everyone!"

Characters

Main 
 Fuse (Red; voiced by Marlon Dance-Hooi): He's the hot-headed leader of the Oddbods. He can instantly change from serene to enraged, which makes his friends avoid him whenever he is in a bad mood, but admire his 'heart of gold'. He is always willing to play sports, but only if he wins.
 Slick (Orange; voiced by Chio Su Ping): He believes in YOLO. But suffers from FOMO. He likes to dance, and tries to act as the cool person in the group.
 Bubbles (Yellow; voiced by Chio Su Ping): She energetically performs experiments with an obsession of discovering interesting objects, such as insects to UFOs. Her friends like her for her personality, although they do not like being excluded from her personal experiments.
 Zee (Green; voiced by Jeremy Linn): He always takes naps, even while eating. His laid-back attitude serves as both strength and weaknesses when it comes to his friendships with the others.
 Pogo (Blue; voiced by Marlon Dance-Hooi): He does not follow common etiquette as he is dubbed the 'ultimate prankster'. His friends like his practical jokes if they are not aimed at them.
 Jeff (Purple; voiced by Jeremy Linn): He is finicky in that he is able to create order in anything, with his friends' admiration of his detail, as he can spot extremely tiny dust particles, and is very tidy. He is very talented in art and remembering people's birthdays, however he wishes that he can act in a more relaxed manner.
 Newt (Pink; voiced by Nadia Ramlee): She is addicted to candy and her friends are inspired by her pleasant interaction towards others, although she can be arrogant. She is inquisitive as she always hangs out with her friends and takes selfies often with them.

Recurring 

Characters who have recurred across different stories although some appeared only in one episode:
 BG Oddbods (Gray; voiced by All Actors): They all look the same and act like citizens of Oddsville, except some BG Oddbods have accessories, like moustaches and hats.
Yin and Yang (Black (Yin) and White (Yang); voiced by Marlon Dance-Hooi): They are the Odd Ninjas. These Ninjas are actually actors of a TV show, not members of the Oddbods.
Modo (Light Blue; voiced by Marlon Dance-Hooi): He only appears in One Two Many. He is a cloned version of Pogo. Modo is a very mischievous character(much like Pogo himself),but even more so than Pogo. He would even have the will to kill Bubbles and Pogo.
Oddroid: Oddroid would do anything with anybody but mostly being Slick who bought him and acts like a friend to all but he gets struck by lightning and,since then, wants to destroy everything and anyone who annoys him and appears to be always in a bad mood.
Genie (voiced by Jeremy Linn): He only appears in the episode Pogo and the Lamp. The Genie seems grumpy and doesn't care that much. He is willing to offer wishes(like a usual Genie) but does not like being woke up constantly.
Robo Helper (voiced by Chio Su Ping and Jeremy Linn) It only appears in Robo Helper. The Robo Helper is a robot that was invented by Bubbles.

Guest 
Characters who had only appeared in Special Episodes

Marv (Gray; voiced by Jeremy Linn): Marv is a magician who had turned most of the Oddbods (except Slick) into monsters because they laughed at him.And so it’s up to Slick to bring back the magician and undo the magic spell and bring back the Oddbods to life again. He has only appeared in Party Monsters.
Santa Claus (Red; voiced by Marlon Dance-Hooi): He appears in the Christmas episode The Festive Menace. He delivers presents to Oddbods. During The Festive Menace, while he delivers the presents to the Oddbods,when he comes to Bubble’s house he accidentally stumbles on the Globe that Bubbles had left for him beside the cookies and milk layed on the table and accidentally triggers the machine that Bubbles had made originally for Pogo to turn his prankster style ways to a good-hearted friend and has turned to the Evil version of Santa Claus.but eventually Pogo and his friends eventually take the Evil Santa down and everything turns back to the way it was before. He later re-appears in Festive Encounters.
Oddbeard: He appears only in Oddbeard's Curse. He is a Pirate Captain with a Golden Tooth who died after the Battle with some Sailors.

Production

Development
Speaking in an interview with the Manchester Evening News in 2016, Richard Thomas, the creator of the Oddbods and creative director at One Animation described how he first devised the show:

One Animation
Founded in 2008, One Animation Pte Ltd is a Singaporean CGI animation studio based in the Alexandra subzone of the Bukit Merah district. The company has also produced Rob the Robot, Insectibles and Development Series (Hard Boiled and Abigail's Tales). The company has produced a portfolio of successful animated series that are broadcast on global networks such as Disney Channel, Cartoon Network, Nickelodeon, Disney XD, Discovery Kids, ABC, and seen across more than 100 countries worldwide.

The company focuses on developing family-focused TV, film and new media content, facilitating shorter than average production schedules, utilizing a crew that is typically one-third the size of a traditional CGI animation production team.

Soundtrack
The soundtrack is composed by Kristin Øhrn Dyrud.

Episodes

Broadcast and release
The series has been broadcast on 25 networks in 105 countries worldwide on free-to-air, as well as subscription channels, such as Boomerang, Disney Channel, Teletoon+, ITV (UK), Cartoonito (Italy), RCTI, ANTV, RTV  (coming soon) Spacetoon (Now) (Indonesia), Kapamilya Channel (Philippines), ETTV Yoyo (Taiwan) and Cartoon Network. It is also available on-demand on social media channels, most notably YouTube, iQIYI (China) and ABC Me (Australia), where it has gained over one billion views in just one year. There are currently approximately 9,75 Million subscribers to the series' YouTube channel. In 2015, the series aired on Disney XD in the United States and last aired in 2015. In 2016 Japan, the series aired on Disney XD with adaptation of The Oddbods Show, only showing in season 1, but it stopped airing and removed the show. The series came on ITVBe's LittleBe on 3 September 2018. Also, the series came to Disney XD in 2020, but stopped airing and streamed episodes on DisneyNOW, which also stopped streaming episodes. In 2017, Netflix added seasons 1 and 2 into their streaming service only other countries available in season 2, such as Singapore, Philippines, Japan and South Korea, the streaming removed season 2 and only showing season 1 in 2021.

Reception

Ratings
In 2015, Oddbods was one of the highest-rated children's television shows in the United Kingdom, by number of viewers. It was one of CiTV's top five shows for the first quarter of 2016.

Awards
 2014: Best 3D animation at Television Asia Plus
 2014: Asia Image Apollo Awards
 2014: Apollo Awards: 3D Animation
 2015: Sichuan TV Festival 'God Panda' Award: best animated character
 2016: Web TV Asia Awards
 2017: International Emmy Kids Awards (Nominee)
2019: International Emmy Kids Awards (Nominee)
2020: International Emmy Kids Awards (Nominee)

Interactive
In January 2017, One Animation launched a new look website dedicated to the Oddbods as a place where fans of the show (adults and children alike) can interact with the brand.

The site hosts seven games with player leaderboards. Other features include videos, user generated content, in store section, shop now section, interactive background pages on each of the characters complete with trading card-style character summary and related videos. There is also an interactive collector poster which allows fans to view the episode their collectible figurine was inspired by.

Licensing
In 2016, One Animation announced via press releases various partnerships with key licensing partners for Oddbods around the world including, amongst others, with ITV Studios Global Entertainment (ITVS GE) and Copyright Promotions and Licensing Group (CPLG).

This led to the commencement of a global licensing programme being rolled out, the first of which was a range of toys made available first in Europe and the Middle East. As well as extending the toy availability around the world over the course of 2017/18, a wider range of consumer products including apparel, giftware and stationery are also in the pipeline.

Notes

References

External links
 
 Oddbods Youtube Channel
 One Animation website
 

Boomerang (TV network) original programming
ITV children's television shows
Disney Channels Worldwide original programming
Children's animated comedy television series
Computer-animated television series
Singaporean animated television series
2014 Singaporean television series debuts
2010s animated television series
Animated television series without speech